This is a list of some periodicals related to rail transport (or rail transportation).

Africa

Algeria 
 Le Rail Maghreb

South Africa 
 Railways Africa

Australia

National 
 Australian Model Railway Magazine 
 Australian Railway History 
 Australian Railway  1986-1988
 Green over Red 1966-1972
 Light Railways 
 Locomotion 
 Motive Power 
 Narrow Gauge Down Under 
 Network  1964-1999
 Railway Digest 
 Railway Transportation 1954-1972
 Track & Signal 
 Transit Australia 
 Trolley Wire

New South Wales 
 Roundhouse
 Tin Hare Gazette 
 The Railway News

Queensland 
 Sunshine Express

South Australia 
 Catch Point 
 The Recorder   1963-1992

Tasmania 
 Tasmanian Rail News

Victoria 
 Newsrail

Western Australia 
 The Westland

Croatia 
 Željeznice 21
 Željezničar

France 
 :fr:Le Journal des chemins de fer
 La Vie du Rail

Germany 
 Bahn-Report
 Der Eisenbahningenieur
 Eisenbahn Kurier
 Eisenbahntechnische Rundschau
 Modellbahntechnik aktuell ISSN 1866-2803 (2006- ) 
 Rail Business
 Signal und Draht

Italy 
Ingegneria Ferroviaria
Tecnica Professionale
Mondo Ferroviario
Tutto Treno
iTreni

Japan 
 Hobby of Model Railroading (1947-  )
  Japan Railfan Magazine (1961- )

New Zealand 
 New Zealand Railway Observer 
 Tramway topics

Norway 
 Lokaltrafikk  
 På Sporet

Russia 
 Tekhnika zheleznykh dorog (Railway Equipment)

Sri Lanka 
 Lanka Railway Digest - ISSN 2279-1213

Switzerland 
 Schweizer Eisenbahn-Revue

United Kingdom 
 BackTrack  1987-
 British Railways Illustrated 
 Continental Railway Journal 
 European Rail Timetable (formerly the Thomas Cook European Timetable), 1873– ,  
 Great Western Railway Journal 
 Heritage Railway   1999-
 International Railway Journal
 Locomotives International 
 Modern Locomotives Illustrated
 Metro Report International
 Modern Railways 
 Modern Tramway 
 Narrow Gauge World  
 Rail 
 Rail Business Intelligence (formerly Rail Privatisation News)
 Rail Express  - also modelling
 Railnews 1963-
 Rail Professional 
 RailReview Railway Bylines 
 Railway Gazette International The Railway Magazine 
 The Railway Observer 
 Railways Illustrated 
 Steam Days 
 Steam Railway, 1979– , 0
 Railway World 
 Steam World 
 Thomas Cook Continental Timetable (now the European Rail Timetable), 1873–
 Today's Railways UK (formerly Entrain) 
 Traction 
 Tramway Review 
 Tramways & Urban Transit (formerly Modern Tramway),  1938–

 Defunct 
 Bradshaw's Guide 1831-1961
 Diesel Railway Traction Herapath's Railway and Commercial Journal (incorrectly spelled "Herepath" in some sources)
 Locomotive, Railway Carriage & Wagon Review The Locomotive Magazine 1896-1959
 Locomotives Illustrated Railway Herald 1885-1903
 The Railway System Illustrated Trains and Railways Modelling 
 British Railway Modelling 
 GardenRail 
 Model Rail 
 Model Railway Constructor   (Mid-1930s – June 1987)
 Model Railway Journal (Jan 1985-date)
 Model Railway News (1925-Aug 1971), thereafter 'Model Railways (Sep 1971-Sep 1984), thereafter Your Model Railway  (Oct 1984-Jun 1985), thereafter Your Model Railway  (Jul 1985-Jun 1987), thereafter back to Model Railways (Jul 1987-Feb 1994), ceased
 Narrow Gauge and Industrial Railway Modelling Review  (1989 to present)
 Practical Model Railways  (Dec 1983-Feb 1989), ceased
 Railway Modeller

United States 
 CTC Board, 
 Electric Railway Journal, 
 Live Steam and Outdoor Railroading
 Model Railroader  
 Narrow Gauge and Shortline Gazette
 The New Electric Railway Journal; 
 Pacific RailNews  
 Passenger Train Journal, 
 Rail News
 Railfan & Railroad 
 Railroad Gazette
 Railroad Man's Magazine 
 Railroad Model Craftsman  
 Railroads Illustrated  
 Railway Age, 
 Railway Track & Structures, 
 Tall Timber Short Lines
 Trains,

International 
 European Rail Timetable (formerly the Thomas Cook European Timetable, or Continental Timetable before 1988), 1873–  , 
 International Railway Journal (IRJ), 
 Janes World Railways, 
 Metro Report International
 Railway Gazette International, 
 Today's Railways Europe, 
 Tramways & Urban Transit (formerly Modern Tramway),  1938–

Institutional 
 Institution of Civil Engineers
 Institution of Mechanical Engineers
 Institution of Railway Signal Engineers
 Permanent Way Institution - Journal and report of proceedings

See also 
 Rail transport periodical

References 

 
Railroad-related periodicals
Railroad